ACCC may refer to:

Industry 
 ACCC conductor, Aluminium Conductor Composite Core, high voltage power line cables

Education
 Association of Canadian Community Colleges, a national association formed in 1972
 Atlantic Cape Community College, an accredited, co-educational, two-year, public, community college

Sports
 Alabama Community College Conference, the athletic conference of the community colleges in Alabama
 Hockey Africa Cup for Club Champions, a men's field hockey competition for clubs in Africa.
 Hockey Africa Cup for Club Champions (women), a women's field hockey competition for clubs in Africa.

Law
 Australian Competition & Consumer Commission, an independent Australian Commonwealth government authority established in 1995
 Aarhus Convention Compliance Committee, the body ensuring compliance with the Aarhus Convention on access to information, public participation in decision-making and access to justice in environmental matters

Religion
 American Council of Christian Churches, a national council of churches
 Anglican Catholic Church of Canada, an Anglican church that was founded in the 1970s by conservative Anglicans
 The Australian Centre for Christianity and Culture, a Christian ecumenical centre

Other uses
 Adams County Correctional Center, a private prison